Mijo Caktaš (born 8 May 1992) is a Croatian professional footballer who plays as an attacking midfielder for NK Osijek  in Prva HNL.

Club career
A native of Dugopolje, Mijo Caktaš started training with his hometown club NK Dugopolje, moving to the "NK Omladinac Vranjic" youth team when he was 14. After two seasons there he returned to Dugopolje, debuting for the senior team in the 2008–09 season of the Treća HNL South, at only 16 years old, he drew the attention of Hajduk Split scouts.

Hajduk
He was integrated in the Hajduk U19 team the following season. In summer 2011, he was sent to Dugopolje on loan, and his performances in the autumn Druga HNL leader earned him a call back to the Hajduk first team. In February 2012, he signed a four-and-a-half-year contract with the club. He made his debut for the first team in a 1–1 draw against Istra 1961 on 25 February 2012. The following month, he scored his first goal in Prva HNL in a 3–0 win against Rijeka and also provided two assists for Ante Vukušić. In the next game, he scored the only goal in a 1–0 victory over Cibalia.

In the 2012/13 season, Caktaš had an explosion of form as he became a main member of the first team at Poljud. He scored nine goals and assisted six more in 30 league games. The 2013/14 season started similarly well, with the player scoring two in his first seven games, but suffered a cruciate ligament rupture in round 5 and didn't return until the closing phase of the season, making just three more appearances that season.

With a full pre-season, Mijo Caktaš returned stronger than ever for the 2014-15 season. Good performances followed and the player captained his side for the first time against RNK Split in a round 9 encounter. Caktaš finished the season with 11 goals in 42 games.

Caktaš scored four goals in the Europa League Qualifiers in the 2015/16 season as Hajduk bowed out to Slovan Liberec in the final qualifying round. After good early performances in the league as well, Caktaš was handed an improved contract on 21 September 2015, ending in mid-2018.

Rubin Kazan
On 21 January 2016 he was transferred to Rubin Kazan for €1m. He signed a contract until 2019. In January 2018, Caktaš terminated his contract with Rubin Kazan due to the non-payment of wages. Rubin disputed his decision to terminate his contract and entered legal proceedings against the player. In total, Caktaš made 38 appearances for the club over two years, scoring five goals and making six assists.

Return to Hajduk 
After terminating his contract with Rubin, Caktaš returned to Hajduk, signing a three and a half year deal. In July 2018, he made his 150th Hajduk appearance in a 1-0 win over PFC Slavia Sofia.

Caktaš finished the 2018-19 season as the league's top-scorer with 19 goals, and as the second best scorer of all midfielders in Europe, just behind Sporting's Bruno Fernandes that scored 20. He also won the Sportske novosti Yellow Shirt award for the best player in the league that season.

He maintained the goalscoring form in the following season, netting 20 matches in 32 games, just like the Rijeka striker Antonio Čolak who won the top scorer award due to a smaller play-time.

Damac FC and NK Osijek 
After being sidelined for half a season in 2020-21, on 17 July 2021, Caktaš signed a two year long contract with Damac FC. The contract was terminated after just 6 months, having scored 4 goals in 16 games.
On 21 January 2022, it was confirmed that Caktaš would continue his career in NK Osijek.

International career 
In August 2015, he received a first call-up for the senior national team for the Euro 2016 qualifying matches against Azerbaijan and Norway, but remained an unused substitute in both matches.

On 27 May 2019, Croatian manager Zlatko Dalić activated Caktaš's stand-by call up for matches against Wales and Tunisia. He debuted in the friendly against Tunisia.

Career statistics

Club

Notes

Honours

Club
Croatian Cup: 2012-13

Individual
Croatian First League Top Scorer: 2018-19
Sportske novosti Yellow Shirt award: 2018-19

References

External links

Mijo Caktaš at hajduk.hr

1992 births
Living people
Footballers from Split, Croatia
Association football midfielders
Croatian footballers
Croatia youth international footballers
Croatia under-21 international footballers
Croatia international footballers
NK Dugopolje players
HNK Hajduk Split players
FC Rubin Kazan players
Damac FC players
NK Osijek players
Croatian Football League players
First Football League (Croatia) players
Russian Premier League players
Saudi Professional League players
Croatian expatriate footballers
Expatriate footballers in Russia
Croatian expatriate sportspeople in Russia
Expatriate footballers in Saudi Arabia
Croatian expatriate sportspeople in Saudi Arabia